Weightlifting at the 2015 Pacific Games in Port Moresby, Papua New Guinea was held on July 5–8, 2015.

The event was also designated the 2015 Oceania Senior, Junior & Youth Championships, meaning the same competitor could earn up to 4 medals for the same result (totals only).

Medal summary

Medal table (Pacific Games)

Medal table (Oceania Senior Championships)
Medals were awarded for totals only.

Results shown below are attributed to the Pacific Games and (totals only) Oceania Senior Championships. Oceania Junior and Youth results cited here and here respectively.

Men's results

Women's results

See also
 Weightlifting at the Pacific Games

References

2015 Pacific Games
Pacific Games
2015
Oceania Weightlifting Championships